Kiveton Park railway station serves Kiveton Park in South Yorkshire, England. The original station was opened by the Sheffield and Lincolnshire Junction Railway in 1849, situated to the east of the level crossing and opened with the line. It was rebuilt in the Manchester, Sheffield and Lincolnshire Railway "Double Pavilion" style in 1884, on the west side of the level crossing.

Kiveton Park was a centre of lime working in the area, and many company sidings came under the jurisdiction of its Station Master. Adjacent to the station was the Dog Kennels Lime and Stone Works, named after the road linking the station to Anston, and the Kiveton Park Lime and Stone Works. Just to the east were the Kiveton Park and Anston lime quarries. All the companies had lime burning facilities and agricultural lime was supplied, by rail, to outlets in Lincolnshire. Kiveton Park Colliery was located to the west of the station, and was rail-connected until its closure in 1994.

Along with neighbouring Kiveton Bridge station, it was completely rebuilt during the early 1990s with modern platforms, lighting and waiting shelters, this work being funded by the South Yorkshire Passenger Transport Executive. The only remaining part of the 1884 station is the Station Master's house (now privately owned) which stands on the Sheffield-bound (down) platform. It is now unstaffed (all tickets must be purchased on the train or prior to travel), with train running details provided by display screens, telephone and timetable poster boards. Step-free access is available to both platforms from the adjacent level crossing (which is still operated from the adjacent signal box).

Severe damage was caused to the embankment and tracks near here during the widespread flooding in 2007. Repairs cost over £1 million, and the line was closed for several weeks whilst the embankment was rebuilt and the tracks relaid.

Services
All services at Kiveton Park are operated by Northern Trains using  and  DMUs.

The typical off-peak service in trains per hour is:
 1 tph to  via 
 1 tph to  via 

References 
East of Sheffield, Roger Milnes. Forward, the journal of the Great Central Railway Society, March 1978. ISSN 0141-4488

External links

Railway stations in Rotherham
DfT Category F2 stations
Former Great Central Railway stations
Railway stations in Great Britain opened in 1849
Northern franchise railway stations
1849 establishments in England